The Prime Minister's Office (PMO; ;) is the executive branch of the Government of Singapore responsible for overseeing the other ministries and political matters that are of great importance to the nation, such as tackling corruption and holding elections. It is headed by the prime minister and other appointed ministers. The PMO is located in The Istana, which is also the official residence and office of the President of Singapore.

In Singapore, a Member of Parliament (MP) appointed as 'Minister in the Prime Minister's Office' was previously known as 'Minister without Portfolio', an official cabinet appointment title under the Westminster parliamentary system.

Statutory boards
The PMO oversees three statutory boards;
 Government Technology Agency (GovTech)
 Monetary Authority of Singapore (MAS)
 Civil Service College (CSC)

See also 

 Government of Singapore
 Cabinet of Singapore
 Prime Minister of Singapore

References

External links

Singapore Government Directory Interactive — Prime Minister's Office

Singapore
Government ministries of Singapore